Intellect is the ability of the human mind to reach correct conclusions about what is true and what is false in reality, and how to solve problems.

Intellect may also refer to:

 Intellect (trade association), now TechUK
 Intellect Games, a 1970s board game manufacturing company
 "Intellect", a song by Killing Joke, 1998

See also

Active intellect, in medieval philosophy
General intellect, in Marxist theory
Passive intellect, in philosophy
Intellectual, a person who engages in critical thinking, research, and reflection about the reality of society
 Intelligence, the ability to perceive or infer information, and to retain it as knowledge 
 Nous, a concept from classical philosophy